"Guardian Angels" is a song by Harpo Marx and lyricist Gerda Beilenson (1903-1985) originally for the film War Bond Drive. The lyrics begin: "Guardian angels around my bed, Joining me in my prayers". Beilenson's husband was the Marx Brothers’ lawyer, Larry Beilenson, who showed the song to Mario Lanza who recorded it on his Christmas album in 1951. It was recorded by Plácido Domingo for his My Christmas album for Sony in 2014.

References

1945 songs